Pseudonannolenidae is a family of millipedes belonging to the order Spirostreptida.

Genera:
 Cambalomma Loomis, 1941
 Epinannolene Brölemann, 1903
 Holopodostreptus Carl, 1913
 Phallorthus Chamberlin, 1952
 Physiostreptus Silvestri, 1903
 Pseudonannolene Silvestri, 1895
 Typhlonannolene Chamberlin, 1923

References

Spirostreptida